Betsy Morgan may refer to:

'The Two Faces of Betsy Morgan', episode on List of T. J. Hooker episodes
Betsy Morgan, president of TheBlaze
Betsy Morgan (actress) in Return to El Salvador

See also
Elizabeth Morgan (disambiguation)
Betty Morgan (disambiguation)